The metre (or meter in American spelling; symbol: m) is the base unit of length in the International System of Units (SI).

The metre was originally defined in 1793 as one ten-millionth of the distance from the equator to the North Pole along a great circle, so the Earth's circumference is approximately  km. In 1799, the metre was redefined in terms of a prototype metre bar. The actual bar used was changed in 1889. In 1960, the metre was redefined in terms of a certain number of wavelengths of a certain emission line of krypton-86. 

The current definition was adopted in 1983 and modified slightly in 2002 to clarify that the metre is a measure of proper length. After the 2019 redefinition of the SI base units, this definition was rephrased to include the definition of a second in terms of the caesium frequency .

Spelling 
Metre is the standard spelling of the metric unit for length in nearly all English-speaking nations except the United States and the Philippines, which use meter. Other West Germanic languages, such as German and Dutch, and North Germanic languages, such as Danish, Norwegian, and Swedish, likewise spell the word Meter or meter.

Measuring devices (such as ammeter, speedometer) are spelled "-meter" in all variants of English. The suffix "-meter" has the same Greek origin as the unit of length.

Etymology 
The etymological roots of metre can be traced to the Greek verb  (to measure, count or compare) and noun  (a measure), which were used for physical measurement, for poetic metre and by extension for moderation or avoiding extremism (as in "be measured in your response"). This range of uses is also found in Latin, French, English and other languages. The Greek word is derived from the Proto-Indo-European root *meh₁- 'to measure'. The motto  in the seal of the International Bureau of Weights and Measures (BIPM), which was a saying of the Greek statesman and philosopher Pittacus of Mytilene and may be translated as "Use measure!", thus calls for both measurement and moderation. The use of the word metre (for the French unit ) in English began at least as early as 1797.

History of definition

Pendulum or meridian
In 1671, Jean Picard measured the length of a "seconds pendulum" and proposed a unit of measurement twice that length to be called the universal toise (French: Toise universelle). In 1675, Tito Livio Burattini suggested the term metre for a unit of length based on a pendulum length, but then it was discovered that the length of a seconds pendulum varies from place to place.

Since Eratosthenes, geographers had used meridian arcs to assess the size of the Earth, which in 1669, Jean Picard determined to have a radius of  toises, treated as a simple sphere. In the 18th century, geodesy  grew in importance as a means of empirically demonstrating the theory of gravity, which Émilie du Châtelet promoted in France in combination with Leibniz mathematical work, and because the radius of the Earth was the unit to which all celestial distances were to be referred.

Meridional definition 

As a result of the Lumières and during the French Revolution, the French Academy of Sciences charged a commission with determining a single scale for all measures. On 7 October 1790 that commission advised the adoption of a decimal system, and on 19 March 1791 advised the adoption of the term  ("measure"), a basic unit of length, which they defined as equal to one ten-millionth of the quarter meridian, the distance between the North Pole and the Equator along the meridian through Paris. On 26 March 1791, the French National Constituent Assembly adopted the proposal.

The French Academy of Sciences commissioned an expedition led by Jean Baptiste Joseph Delambre and Pierre Méchain, lasting from 1792 to 1799, which attempted to accurately measure the distance between a belfry in Dunkirk and Montjuïc castle in Barcelona at the longitude of the Paris Panthéon (see meridian arc of Delambre and Méchain). The expedition was fictionalised in Denis Guedj, . Ken Alder wrote factually about the expedition in The Measure of All Things: the seven year odyssey and hidden error that transformed the world. 

This portion of the Paris meridian was to serve as the basis for the length of the half meridian connecting the North Pole with the Equator. From 1801 to 1812 France adopted this definition of the metre as its official unit of length based on results from this expedition combined with those of the Geodesic Mission to Peru. The latter was related by Larrie D. Ferreiro in Measure of the Earth: The Enlightenment Expedition That Reshaped Our World.

In the 19th century, geodesy underwent a revolution through advances in mathematics as well as improvements in the instruments and methods of observation, for instance accounting for individual bias in terms of the personal equation. The application of the least squares method to meridian arc measurements demonstrated the importance of the scientific method in geodesy. On the other hand, the invention of the telegraph made it possible to measure parallel arcs, and the improvement of the reversible pendulum gave rise to the study of the Earth's gravitational field. A more accurate determination of the Figure of the Earth would soon result from the measurement of the Struve Geodetic Arc (1816–1855) and would have given another value for the definition of this standard of length. This did not invalidate the metre but highlighted that progress in science would allow better measurement of Earth's size and shape.

In 1832, Carl Friedrich Gauss studied the Earth's magnetic field and proposed adding the second to the basic units of the metre and the kilogram in the form of the CGS system (centimetre, gram, second). The coordination of the observation of geophysical phenomena such as the Earth's magnetic field, lightning and gravity in different points of the globe stimulated the creation of the first international scientific associations.

International prototype metre bar 

In 1816, Ferdinand Rudolph Hassler was appointed first Superintendent of the Survey of the Coast. Trained in geodesy in Switzerland, France and Germany, Hassler had brought a standard metre made in Paris to the United States in 1805. He designed a baseline apparatus which instead of bringing different bars in actual contact during measurements, used only one bar calibrated on the metre and optical contact. Thus the metre became the unit of length for geodesy in the United States.

Since 1830, Hassler was also head of the Bureau of Weights and Measures which became a part of the Coast Survey. He compared various units of length used in the United States at that time and measured coefficients of expansion to assess temperature effects on the measurements.

In 1841, Friedrich Wilhelm Bessel, taking into account errors which had been recognized by Louis Puissant in the French meridian arc comprising the arc measurement of Delambre and Méchain which had been extended southward by François Arago and Jean-Baptiste Biot, recalculated the flattening of the Earth ellipsoid making use of nine more arc measurements, namely Peruan, Prussian, first East-Indian, second East-Indian, English, Hannover, Danish, Russian and Swedish covering almost 50 degrees of latitude, and stated that the Earth quadrant used for determining the length of the metre was nothing more than a rather imprecise conversion factor between the toise and the metre.

Regarding the precision of the conversion from the toise to the metre, both units of measurement were then defined by primary standards, and unique artifacts made of different alloys with distinct coefficients of expansion were the legal basis of units of length. A wrought iron ruler, the Toise of Peru, also called Toise de l'Académie, was the French primary standard of the toise, and the metre was officially defined by the Mètre des Archives made of platinum. Besides the latter, another platinum and twelve iron standards of the metre were made in 1799.

One of them became known as the Committee Meter in the United States and served as standard of length in the Coast Survey until 1890. According to geodesists, these standards were secondary standards deduced from the Toise of Peru. In Europe, surveyors continued to use measuring instruments calibrated on the Toise of Peru. Among these, the toise of Bessel and the apparatus of Borda were respectively the main references for geodesy in Prussia and in France. A French scientific instrument maker, Jean Nicolas Fortin, had made two direct copies of the Toise of Peru, the first for Friedrich Georg Wilhelm von Struve in 1821 and a second for Friedrich Bessel in 1823.

On the subject of the theoretical definition of the metre, it had been inaccessible and misleading at the time of Delambre and Mechain arc measurement, as the geoid is a ball, which on the whole can be assimilated to an oblate spheroid, but which in detail differs from it so as to prohibit any generalization and any extrapolation. As early as 1861, after Friedrich von Schubert showed that the different meridians were not of equal length, Elie Ritter, a mathematician from Geneva, deduced from a computation based on eleven meridian arcs covering 86 degrees that the meridian equation differed from that of the ellipse: the meridian was swelled about the 45th degree of latitude by a layer whose thickness was difficult to estimate because of the uncertainty of the latitude of some stations, in particular that of Montjuïc in the French meridian arc. By measuring the latitude of two stations in Barcelona, Méchain had found that the difference between these latitudes was greater than predicted by direct measurement of distance by triangulation. We know now that, in addition to other errors in the survey of Delambre and Méchain, an unfavourable vertical deflection gave an inaccurate determination of Barcelona's latitude, a metre "too short" compared to a more general definition taken from the average of a large number of arcs.

Nevertheless Ferdinand Rudolph Hassler's use of the metre in coastal survey contributed to the introduction of the Metric Act of 1866 allowing the use of the metre in the United States, and also played an important role in the choice of the metre as international scientific unit of length and the proposal by the European Arc Measurement (German: Europäische Gradmessung) to “establish a European international bureau for weights and measures”. However, in 1866, the most important concern was that the Toise of Peru, the standard of the toise constructed in 1735 for the French Geodesic Mission to the Equator, might be so much damaged that comparison with it would be worthless, while Bessel had questioned the accuracy of copies of this standard belonging to Altona and Koenigsberg Observatories, which he had compared to each other about 1840. Indeed when the primary Imperial yard standard was partially destroyed in 1834, a new standard of reference had been constructed using copies of the "Standard Yard, 1760" instead of the pendulum's length as provided for in the Weights and Measures Act of 1824.

In 1864, Urbain Le Verrier refused to join the first general conference of the Central European Arc Measurement because the French geodetic works had to be verified.

In 1866, at the meeting of the Permanent Commission of the association in Neuchâtel, Antoine Yvon Villarceau announced that he had checked eight points of the French arc. He confirmed that the metre was too short. It then became urgent to undertake a complete revision of the meridian arc. Moreover, while the extension of the French meridian arc to the Balearic Islands (1803–1807) had seemed to confirm the length of the metre, this survey had not been secured by any baseline in Spain. For that reason, Carlos Ibáñez e Ibáñez de Ibero's announcement, at this conference, of his 1858 measurement of a baseline in Madridejos was of particular importance. Indeed surveyors determined the size of triangulation networks by measuring baselines which concordance granted the accuracy of the whole survey.

In 1867 at the second general conference of the International Association of Geodesy held in Berlin, the question of an international standard unit of length was discussed in order to combine the measurements made in different countries to determine the size and shape of the Earth. The conference recommended the adoption of the metre in replacement of the toise and the creation of an international metre commission, according to the proposal of Johann Jacob Baeyer, Adolphe Hirsch and Carlos Ibáñez e Ibáñez de Ibero who had devised two geodetic standards calibrated on the metre for the map of Spain.

Ibáñez adopted the system which Ferdinand Rudolph Hassler used for the United States Survey of the Coast, consisting of a single standard with lines marked on the bar and microscopic measurements. Regarding the two methods by which the effect of temperature was taken into account, Ibáñez used both the bimetallic rulers, in platinum and brass, which he first employed for the central baseline of Spain, and the simple iron ruler with inlaid mercury thermometers which was utilized in Switzerland. These devices, the first of which is referred to as either Brunner apparatus or Spanish Standard, were constructed in France by Jean Brunner, then his sons. Measurement traceability between the toise and the metre was ensured by comparison of the Spanish Standard with the standard devised by Borda and Lavoisier for the survey of the meridian arc connecting Dunkirk with Barcelona.

Hassler's metrological and geodetic work also had a favourable response in Russia. In 1869, the Saint Petersburg Academy of Sciences sent to the French Academy of Sciences a report drafted by Otto Wilhelm von Struve, Heinrich von Wild and Moritz von Jacobi inviting his French counterpart to undertake joint action to ensure the universal use of the metric system in all scientific work.

In the 1870s and in light of modern precision, a series of international conferences was held to devise new metric standards. When a conflict broke out regarding the presence of impurities in the metre-alloy of 1874, a member of the Preparatory Committee since 1870 and Spanish representative at the Paris Conference in 1875, Carlos Ibáñez e Ibáñez de Ibero intervened with the French Academy of Sciences to rally France to the project to create an International Bureau of Weights and Measures equipped with the scientific means necessary to redefine the units of the metric system according to the progress of sciences.

The Metre Convention (Convention du Mètre) of 1875 mandated the establishment of a permanent International Bureau of Weights and Measures to be located in Sèvres, France. This new organisation was to construct and preserve a prototype metre bar, distribute national metric prototypes, and maintain comparisons between them and non-metric measurement standards. The organisation distributed such bars in 1889 at the first General Conference on Weights and Measures, establishing the International Prototype Metre as the distance between two lines on a standard bar composed of an alloy of 90% platinum and 10% iridium, measured at the melting point of ice.

The comparison of the new prototypes of the metre with each other and with the Committee metre (French: Mètre des Archives) involved the development of special measuring equipment and the definition of a reproducible temperature scale. The BIPM's thermometry work led to the discovery of special alloys of iron-nickel, in particular invar, for which its director, the Swiss physicist Charles-Edouard Guillaume, was granted the Nobel Prize for physics in 1920.

As Carlos Ibáñez e Ibáñez de Ibero stated, the progress of metrology combined with those of gravimetry through improvement of Kater's pendulum led to a new era of geodesy. If precision metrology had needed the help of geodesy, the latter could not continue to prosper without the help of metrology. It was then necessary to define a single unit to express all the measurements of terrestrial arcs and all determinations of the force of gravity by the mean of pendulum. Metrology had to create a common unit, adopted and respected by all civilized nations.

Moreover, at that time, statisticians knew that scientific observations are marred by two distinct types of errors, constant errors on the one hand, and fortuitous errors, on the other hand. The effects of the latters can be mitigated by the least-squares method. Constant or regular errors on the contrary must be carefully avoided, because they arise from one or more causes that constantly act in the same way and have the effect of always altering the result of the experiment in the same direction. They therefore deprive of any value the observations that they impinge. However, the distinction between systematic and random errors is far from being as sharp as one might think at first assessment. In reality, there are no or very few random errors. As science progresses, the causes of certain errors are sought out, studied, their laws discovered. These errors pass from the class of random errors into that of systematic errors. The ability of the observer consists in discovering the greatest possible number of systematic errors in order to be able, once he has become acquainted with their laws, to free his results from them using a method or appropriate corrections.

For metrology the matter of expansibility was fundamental; as a matter of fact the temperature measuring error related to the length measurement in proportion to the expansibility of the standard and the constantly renewed efforts of metrologists to protect their measuring instruments against the interfering influence of temperature revealed clearly the importance they attached to the expansion-induced errors. It was thus crucial to compare at controlled temperatures with great precision and to the same unit all the standards for measuring geodetic baselines and all the pendulum rods. Only when this series of metrological comparisons would be finished with a probable error of a thousandth of a millimetre would geodesy be able to link the works of the different nations with one another, and then proclaim the result of the measurement of the Globe.

As the figure of the Earth could be inferred from variations of the seconds pendulum length with latitude, the United States Coast Survey instructed Charles Sanders Peirce in the spring of 1875 to proceed to Europe for the purpose of making pendulum experiments to chief initial stations for operations of this sort, in order to bring the determinations of the forces of gravity in America into communication with those of other parts of the world; and also for the purpose of making a careful study of the methods of pursuing these researches in the different countries of Europe. In 1886 the association of geodesy changed name for the International Geodetic Association, which Carlos Ibáñez e Ibáñez de Ibero presided up to his death in 1891. During this period the International Geodetic Association (German: Internationale Erdmessung) gained worldwide importance with the joining of United States, Mexico, Chile, Argentina and Japan.

Efforts to supplement the various national surveying systems, which began in the 19th century with the foundation of the Mitteleuropäische Gradmessung, resulted in a series of global ellipsoids of the Earth (e.g., Helmert 1906, Hayford 1910 and 1924) which would later lead to develop the World Geodetic System. Nowadays the practical realisation of the metre is possible everywhere thanks to the atomic clocks embedded in GPS satellites.

Wavelength definition 
In 1873, James Clerk Maxwell suggested that light emitted by an element be used as the standard both for the metre and for the second. These two quantities could then be used to define the unit of mass.

In 1893, the standard metre was first measured with an interferometer by Albert A. Michelson, the inventor of the device and an advocate of using some particular wavelength of light as a standard of length. By 1925, interferometry was in regular use at the BIPM. However, the International Prototype Metre remained the standard until 1960, when the eleventh CGPM defined the metre in the new International System of Units (SI) as equal to  wavelengths of the orange-red emission line in the electromagnetic spectrum of the krypton-86 atom in a vacuum.

Speed of light definition 
To further reduce uncertainty, the 17th CGPM in 1983 replaced the definition of the metre with its current definition, thus fixing the length of the metre in terms of the second and the speed of light:

This definition fixed the speed of light in vacuum at exactly  metres per second (≈ or ≈1.079 billion km/hour). An intended by-product of the 17th CGPM's definition was that it enabled scientists to compare lasers accurately using frequency, resulting in wavelengths with one-fifth the uncertainty involved in the direct comparison of wavelengths, because interferometer errors were eliminated. To further facilitate reproducibility from lab to lab, the 17th CGPM also made the iodine-stabilised helium–neon laser "a recommended radiation" for realising the metre.

This uncertainty is currently one limiting factor in laboratory realisations of the metre, and it is several orders of magnitude poorer than that of the second, based upon the caesium fountain atomic clock. Consequently, a  realisation of the metre is usually delineated (not defined) today in labs as  wavelengths of helium-neon laser light in a vacuum, the error stated being only that of frequency determination. This bracket notation expressing the error is explained in the article on measurement uncertainty.

Practical realisation of the metre is subject to uncertainties in characterising the medium, to various uncertainties of interferometry, and to uncertainties in measuring the frequency of the source. A commonly used medium is air, and the National Institute of Standards and Technology (NIST) has set up an online calculator to convert wavelengths in vacuum to wavelengths in air. As described by NIST, in air, the uncertainties in characterising the medium are dominated by errors in measuring temperature and pressure. Errors in the theoretical formulas used are secondary. 

By implementing a refractive index correction such as this, an approximate realisation of the metre can be implemented in air, for example, using the formulation of the metre as  wavelengths of helium–neon laser light in a vacuum, and converting the wavelengths in a vacuum to wavelengths in air. Air is only one possible medium to use in a realisation of the metre, and any partial vacuum can be used, or some inert atmosphere like helium gas, provided the appropriate corrections for refractive index are implemented.

The metre is defined as the path length travelled by light in a given time, and practical laboratory length measurements in metres are determined by counting the number of wavelengths of laser light of one of the standard types that fit into the length, and converting the selected unit of wavelength to metres. Three major factors limit the accuracy attainable with laser interferometers for a length measurement:
 uncertainty in vacuum wavelength of the source,
 uncertainty in the refractive index of the medium,
 least count resolution of the interferometer.
Of these, the last is peculiar to the interferometer itself. The conversion of a length in wavelengths to a length in metres is based upon the relation

which converts the unit of wavelength λ to metres using c, the speed of light in vacuum in m/s. Here n is the refractive index of the medium in which the measurement is made, and f is the measured frequency of the source. Although conversion from wavelengths to metres introduces an additional error in the overall length due to measurement error in determining the refractive index and the frequency, the measurement of frequency is one of the most accurate measurements available.

The CIPM issued a clarification in 2002:

Timeline

Early adoptions of the metre internationally
In France, the metre was adopted as an exclusive measure in 1801 under the Consulate. This continued under the First French Empire until 1812, when Napoleon decreed the introduction of the non-decimal mesures usuelles, which remained in use in France up to 1840 in the reign of Louis Philippe. Meanwhile, the metre was adopted by the Republic of Geneva. After the joining of the canton of Geneva to Switzerland in 1815, Guillaume Henri Dufour published the first official Swiss map, for which the metre was adopted as the unit of length. 

Louis Napoléon Bonaparte, a Swiss–French binational officer, was present when a baseline was measured near Zürich for the Dufour map, which would win the gold medal for a national map at the Exposition Universelle of 1855. Among the scientific instruments calibrated on the metre that were displayed at the Exposition Universelle, was Brunner's apparatus, a geodetic instrument devised for measuring the central baseline of Spain, whose designer, Carlos Ibáñez e Ibáñez de Ibero would represent Spain at the International Statistical Institute. In 1885, in addition to the Exposition Universelle and the second Statistical Congress held in Paris, an International Association for Obtaining a Uniform Decimal System of Measures, Weights, and Coins was created there. 

Copies of the Spanish standard were made for Egypt, France and Germany. These standards were compared to each other and with the Borda apparatus, which was the main reference for measuring all geodetic bases in France. In 1869, Napoleon III convened the International Metre Commission, which met in Paris in 1870. The Franco-Prussian War broke out, the Second French Empire collapsed, but the metre survived.

Metre adoption dates by country 
 France: 1801 - 1812, then 1840,
 Republic of Geneva, Switzerland: 1813,
 Kingdom of the Netherlands: 1820,
 Kingdom of Belgium: 1830,
 Chile: 1848,
 Kingdom of Sardinia, Italy: 1850,
 Spain: 1852,
 Portugal: 1852,
 Colombia: 1853,
 Ecuador: 1856,
 Mexico: 1857,
 Brazil: 1862,
 Argentina: 1863,
 Italy: 1863,
 German Empire, Germany: 1872,
 Austria, 1875,
 Switzerland: 1877.

SI prefixed forms of metre 

SI prefixes can be used to denote decimal multiples and submultiples of the metre, as shown in the table below. Long distances are usually expressed in km, astronomical units (149.6 Gm), light-years (10 Pm), or parsecs (31 Pm), rather than in Mm, Gm, Tm, Pm, Em, Zm or Ym; "30 cm", "30 m", and "300 m" are more common than "3 dm", "3 dam", and "3 hm", respectively.

The terms micron and millimicron can be used instead of micrometre (μm) and nanometre (nm), but this practice may be discouraged.

Equivalents in other units 

Within this table, "inch" and "yard" mean "international inch" and "international yard" respectively, though approximate conversions in the left column hold for both international and survey units.
 "≈" means "is approximately equal to";
 "=" means "is exactly equal to".

One metre is exactly equivalent to inches and to yards.

A simple mnemonic aid exists to assist with conversion, as three "3"s:
 1 metre is nearly equivalent to 3feet inches. This gives an overestimate of 0.125mm; however, the practice of memorising such conversion formulas has been discouraged in favour of practice and visualisation of metric units.

The ancient Egyptian cubit was about 0.5m (surviving rods are 523–529mm). Scottish and English definitions of the ell (two cubits) were 941mm (0.941m) and 1143mm (1.143m) respectively. The ancient Parisian toise (fathom) was slightly shorter than 2m and was standardised at exactly 2m in the mesures usuelles system, such that 1m was exactly toise. The Russian verst was 1.0668km. The Swedish mil was 10.688km, but was changed to 10km when Sweden converted to metric units.

See also 

 Conversion of units for comparisons with other units
 International System of Units
 ISO 1standard reference temperature for length measurements
 Length measurement
 Metre Convention
 Metric system
 Metric prefix
 Metrication
 Orders of magnitude (length)
 SI prefix
 Speed of light
 Vertical metre

Notes

References 
 
 Astin, A. V. & Karo, H. Arnold, (1959), Refinement of values for the yard and the pound, Washington DC: National Bureau of Standards, republished on  National Geodetic Survey web site and the Federal Register (Doc. 59-5442, Filed, 30 June 1959)
 
 
 
 
 
 
 Historical context of the SI: Meter. Retrieved 26 May 2010.
 National Institute of Standards and Technology. (27 June 2011). NIST-F1 Cesium Fountain Atomic Clock. Author.
 National Physical Laboratory. (25 March 2010). Iodine-Stabilised Lasers. Author.
 
 Republic of the Philippines. (2 December 1978). Batas Pambansa Blg. 8: An Act Defining the Metric System and its Units, Providing for its Implementation and for Other Purposes. Author.
 Republic of the Philippines. (10 October 1991). Republic Act No. 7160: The Local Government Code of the Philippines. Author.
  Supreme Court of the Philippines (Second Division). (20 January 2010). G.R. No. 185240. Author.
 Taylor, B.N. and Thompson, A. (Eds.). (2008a). The International System of Units (SI). United States version of the English text of the eighth edition (2006) of the International Bureau of Weights and Measures publication Le Système International d’ Unités (SI) (Special Publication 330). Gaithersburg, MD: National Institute of Standards and Technology. Retrieved 18 August 2008.
 Taylor, B.N. and Thompson, A. (2008b). Guide for the Use of the International System of Units (Special Publication 811). Gaithersburg, MD: National Institute of Standards and Technology. Retrieved 23 August 2008.
 Turner, J. (Deputy Director of the National Institute of Standards and Technology). (16 May 2008)."Interpretation of the International System of Units (the Metric System of Measurement) for the United States". Federal Register Vol. 73, No. 96, p.28432-3.
 Zagar, B.G. (1999). Laser interferometer displacement sensors in J.G. Webster (ed.). The Measurement, Instrumentation, and Sensors Handbook. CRC Press. .

 
SI base units